Ronny Thorsen (born 3 January 1978 in Kristiansand, Vest-Agder, Norway) is a Norwegian vocalist most notable for being the harsh vocalist, lyricist, and formerly the only constant member of the band Trail of Tears, until he left the band in 2013. He has also been a session vocalist for the bands Blood Red Throne and Scariot and was a guest for the band Tristania. For the 2005 Napalm Awards for Napalm Records, Ronny Thorsen placed third in the categories of Artist of the Year and Best Male Vocalist.

Discography

With Trail of Tears

Natt (demo, 1996) (Trail of Tears made this album under the moniker of Natt.)
When Silence Cries (demo, 1997)
Disclosure in Red (full-length, 1998)
Profoundemonium (full-length, 2000)
A New Dimension of Might (full-length, 2002)
Free Fall Into Fear (full-length, 2005)
Existentia (full-length, 2007)
Bloodstained Endurance (full-length, 2009)
Oscillation (full-length, 2013)

With Viper Solfa 
 Carving an Icon (full-length, 2015)

As a guest or session musician

Deathmix 2000 by Blood Red Throne (demo, 2000)
Deathforlorn by Scariot (full-length, 2000)
World of Glass by Tristania (full-length, 2001)

References

1978 births
21st-century Norwegian male singers
21st-century Norwegian singers
Black metal singers
Living people
Musicians from Kristiansand
Norwegian singer-songwriters